Robert Raymond Barry (May 15, 1915 – June 14, 1988) was an American politician and a Republican member of the United States House of Representatives from New York.

Biography
Barry was born in Omaha, Nebraska, and received early education in the public schools of Evanston, Illinois. He attended Hamilton College from 1933 to 1936, the Tuck School of Business at Dartmouth College in 1937, and New York University in 1938. He became a member of the International Seamen's Union and later helped organize the International Chamber of Commerce.

Career
At the start of his career, Barry became active in investment banking with Kidder, Peabody & Co. He later worked in commercial banking with Manufacturers Trust Company, and was an executive of Bendix Aviation from 1940 to 1943, and Yale & Towne Manufacturing from 1945 to 1950. He was also involved in farming, mining, and real estate development.

During World War II, Barry worked in the office of the Undersecretary of the Navy. He served on the political staffs of Wendell Willkie, Governor Thomas Dewey and Presidents Dwight D. Eisenhower and Richard Nixon. He was the United States delegate to several NATO Parliamentary Assemblies and to UNESCO. He was chairman of the United Nations Committee to Build the Perry World House.

Barry's business ventures included mining operations in Portola, California, and real estate development near California's Salton Sea.

In 1958, Barry was elected to the Eighty-sixth Congress as a Republican as the representative of New York's 27th district, which included his hometown of Yonkers. He was reelected in 1960 and 1962, and served in the United States House of Representatives from January 3, 1959, to January 3, 1965; in his final term, redistricting moved him to the 27th District. Barry was an unsuccessful candidate for reelection to the Eighty-ninth Congress in 1964.

Barry had spent a great deal of time in California even while representing New York in Congress. After losing his 1964 campaign, he made California his permanent residence. In 1966, he was the unsuccessful Republican nominee for California's 38th Congressional District. He was an unsuccessful candidate in the 1967 special election for California's 11th district, and again in the 1968 general election. In 1970, Barry ran unsuccessfully for the Republican nomination for the U.S. Senate from California. In 1972, he was defeated for the Republican nomination in California's 17th district. In 1982, President Ronald Reagan appointed Barry to the advisory council of the Peace Corps.

Memberships
Barry was a member of the Farm Bureau, the Friendly Sons of St. Patrick, and Alpha Delta Phi fraternity.

Death
Barry died in Redwood City, California on June 14, 1988 (age 73 years, 30 days). The location of his interment is unknown.

Family
He married Anne Rogers Benjamin on July 19, 1945. They were the parents of one son, Henry and one daughter, Cynthia.

References

External links

1915 births
1988 deaths
Hamilton College (New York) alumni
Republican Party members of the United States House of Representatives from New York (state)
20th-century American politicians
Bendix Corporation people